The Liverpool Evening Express was a local newspaper that circulated in Liverpool, England from 1870 to 1958. Originally published by Tinling C & Co. Ltd, the paper merged with the Liverpool Echo in 1958.

References

Publications established in 1870
Defunct newspapers published in the United Kingdom
Mass media in Liverpool